Garayev or Garaev is a masculine surname common among Azeris, Volga Tatars, Turkmens, Bashkirs; its feminine form is Garayeva or Garaeva. The surname may refer to:
 
Abulfaz Garayev (born 1956), Azerbaijani politician
Aliheydar Garayev (1896–1938), Soviet revolutionary
Aliya Garayeva (born 1988), Russian rhythmic gymnast
Faig Garayev (born 1959), Azerbaijani volleyball coach and former player
Faraj Garayev (born 1943), Azerbaijani music composer and teacher, son of Gara
Gara Garayev (1918–1982), Azerbaijani classical composer
Gara Garayev (footballer) (born 1992), Azerbaijani football midfielder
Marat Garaev (born 1990), Russian football player
Vusal Garaev (born 1986), Azerbaijan U-21 player
Yuliya Garayeva (born 1968), Russian fencer

See also
 Gareyev

Azerbaijani-language surnames
Tatar-language surnames
Turkmen-language surnames
Bashkir-language surnames